Tippaiguda is a village and panchayat in Ranga Reddy district, Telangana, India. It falls under Manchal mandal and is close to the Rachakonda Fort. This Village was ruled by Pulikanti Dynasty belongs to Reddy community under the Nizam of Hyderabad.

References

Villages in Ranga Reddy district